Gongora subg. Acropera is a subgenus of Gongora, containing seven species.

References

Orchid subgenera
Acropera